Ga North Municipal District is one of the twenty-nine districts in Greater Accra Region, Ghana. Originally it was formerly part of the then-larger Ga West District in 2004, until the eastern part of the district was split off to create Ga North Municipal District on 15 March 2018, which was supported by Legislative Instrument (L.I.) 2314; thus the remaining part has been retained as Ga West Municipal District. The municipality is located in the western part of Greater Accra Region and has Ofankor as its capital town.

Schools in the District

Hospitals 
 Ga North Municipal Hospital
 Amamorley Community Clinic
 Anglican Community Hospital at Pokuase

Economic Activities

References

Accra
Greater Accra Region
Districts of Greater Accra Region